Red curry (lit.: 'spicy curry') is a popular Thai dish consisting of red curry paste cooked in coconut milk with meat added, such as chicken, beef, pork, duck or shrimp, or vegetarian protein source such as tofu.

Red curry paste
The base Thai red curry paste is traditionally made with a mortar and pestle, and remains moist throughout the preparation process. The red coloring derived from dry red spur chillies – which is dried phrik chi fa red chilies. The main ingredients include (dried) red chili peppers, garlic, shallots, galangal, shrimp paste, salt, makrut lime leaves, coriander root, coriander seeds, cumin seeds, peppercorns and lemongrass. Today, the prepared Thai red curry pastes are available at markets produced in mass quantities, and also available in bottled jar produced by some brands.

Ingredients and preparation
The prepared red curry paste is cooked on a saucepan with cooking oil, to which coconut milk is added. Then the meat as protein source is added into the curry-base soup. Various kinds of meats could be made as red curry, such as chicken, beef, pork, shrimp, duck, or even exotic meats such as frog and snake meats. The most common however, are chicken, pork and beef. The meat is cut into bite-sized pieces. Common additives are fish sauce, sugar, chopped Makrut lime leaves, Thai eggplant, bamboo shoots, and Thai basil (bai horapha).

Tofu, meat analogues or vegetables such as pumpkin can be substituted as a pseudo-vegetarian option, but due to the presence of shrimp paste in curry paste, substituting protein does not make the dish vegetarian. There are, however, vegetarian red curry pastes available.

This dish normally has a soup-like consistency and is served in a bowl and eaten with steamed rice. 
 
Red curry paste itself is the core flavouring for a number of other dishes such thot man pla (fish cakes) and sai ua (grilled Chiang Mai sausage).

See also
 Coconut soup
 Thai curry
 Green curry
 Massaman curry

References

External links
 Article About Red Curry and other Thai curries
 Red Curry Paste recipe

Thai curries
Foods containing coconut